Eremophila regia is low-growing shrub with pink to red flowers, small thread-like leaves and that is endemic to Western Australia. It grows on rocky hilltops in the Princess Ranges.

Description
Its branches are grey to black and warty. The four stamens and style extend beyond the end of the petal tube. Flowering mainly occurs between June and August but also at other times after rainfall.

Taxonomy and naming 
This species was first formally described in 2016 by Bevan Buirchell and Andrew Phillip Brown in the journal Nuytsia from specimens collected in the Princess Ranges in 2004. The specific epithet (regia) is from the Latin regius meaning "royal" or "regal", referring to the type location.

Distribution and habitat
Eremophila regia is only known from the Princess Ranges and on Prenti Downs further east and west of Lake Carnegie. It grows on rocky hilltops in low, open shrubland in the Gascoyne biogeographic region.

Conservation
Eremophila regia is classified is classified as "Priority One" by the Government of Western Australia Department of Parks and Wildlife, meaning that it is known from only one or a few locations which are potentially at risk.

References

Eudicots of Western Australia
regia
Endemic flora of Western Australia
Plants described in 2016
Taxa named by Bevan Buirchell
Taxa named by Andrew Phillip Brown